South Thamaraikulam is a village in Kanyakumari district, Tamil Nadu, near Nagercoil. It is the site of Thamaraikulam Pathi, one of the five holy places of Ayyavazhi.

Kanyakumari
Villages in Kanyakumari district